Philip Roland Smith, Baron Smith of Hindhead,  (born 16 February 1966) is a British Conservative politician and member of the House of Lords. He is  Chief Executive of the Association of Conservative Clubs.

Honours

Smith was appointed a Commander of the Order of the British Empire (CBE) in the 2013 New Year Honours.

He was created a life peer on 29 September 2015, gazetted as Baron Smith of Hindhead, of Hindhead in the County of Surrey.

References

Living people
Conservative Party (UK) life peers
Life peers created by Elizabeth II
Commanders of the Order of the British Empire
Place of birth missing (living people)
1966 births